Simon During (born 1950) is a New Zealand-born academic who completed his PhD at the University of Cambridge. In 1983, he joined the English Department at the University of Melbourne as a tutor, where, ten years later and after visiting positions at the University of Auckland and the Rhetoric Dept, UC Berkeley, he was appointed to the Robert Wallace chair.  After establishing the Cultural Studies, Media and Communications and Publishing programs at Melbourne, he left for Johns Hopkins University in 2001, and taught in the English department there for nine years.

Between 2010 and 2017 he was a Research Professor at the Institute for Advanced Studies in the Humanities at the University of Queensland and in 2018 was appointed a Professorial Fellow at the University of Melbourne. He has also held visiting positions at the Frei Universität Berlin, Universität Tübingen, the American Academy of Rome, the University of Cambridge, Université de Paris and elsewhere. In 2019 he lectured and travelled in Kerala as a recipient of Kerala's Higher Education Council's Erudite Scholar award.
 
He is listed as “Foucault consultant” in the film Ghosts of the Civil Dead by John Hillcoat and Nick Cave.

His scholarly work contributes to the study of British literary history, literary and cultural theory, postcolonialism, secularism, Australian and New Zealand literatures, and has been translated into many languages. His books include Foucault and Literature (Routledge 1991) Patrick White (Oxford 1994), Exit Capitalism, literary culture, theory and post-secular modernity (Routledge 2010) and, most recently, Against Democracy: literary experience in the era of emancipations (Fordham 2012). His anthology The Cultural Studies Reader is a standard textbook in the field. Perhaps his best-known book is Modern Enchantments: The Cultural and Secular Power of Magic (2002), which explores the history of magic.

During's work mainly focuses on the history and theory of the humanities. He has a longstanding interest in relations between Anglicanism and literature between 1688 and 1945. In recent years, he has also been associated with postcritique.

Publications

The Cultural Studies Reader (1993)
Foucault and Literature (1993) 
Patrick White (1996)
Modern Enchantments: The Cultural Power of Secular Magic (2002)
Cultural Studies: A Critical Introduction (2005)
The Cultural Studies Reader: Third Expanded Edition (2007)
Exit Capitalism: Literary Culture, Theory and Post-Secular Modernity (2009)
Against Democracy: Literary Experience in the Era of Emancipations (2012)

References

External links
Modern Enchantments: An Interview with Simon During

1950 births
Historians of magic
University of Melbourne alumni
Living people
New Zealand emigrants to Australia